The 2021–22 NBL season was the 41st season for the Adelaide 36ers in the NBL.

Roster

Pre-season

Ladder

Game log 

|-style="background:#cfc;"
| 1
| 14 November
| @ Cairns
| W 87–91 (OT)
| Daniel Johnson (33)
| Cameron Bairstow (11)
| Dech, McCarron (4)
| MyState Bank Arena4,500
| 1–0
|-style="background:#cfc;"
| 2
| 16 November
| @ Perth
| W 56–63
| Hannahs, King (11)
| Bairstow, Humphries (7)
| Mitch McCarron (4)
| MyState Bank Arenanot available
| 2–0
|-style="background:#cfc;"
| 3
| 21 November
| Tasmania
| W 82–80
| Dusty Hannahs (19)
| Isaac Humphries (6)
| Mitch McCarron (12)
| Ulverstone Sports & Leisure Centrenot available
| 3–0
|-style="background:#cfc;"
| 4
| 26 November
| Perth
| W 97–93
| Hannahs, Withers (19)
| Daniel Johnson (6)
| Mitch McCarron (9)
| Elphin Sports Centrenot available
| 4–0
|-style="background:#cfc;"
| 5
| 28 November
| @ Brisbane
| W 67–72
| Daniel Johnson (16)
| Nick Marshall (12)
| Mitch McCarron (8)
| MyState Bank Arenanot available
| 5–0

Regular season

Ladder

Game log 

|-style="background:#fcc;"
| 1
| 3 December
| @ Perth
| L 85–73
| Daniel Johnson (22)
| Todd Withers (11)
| Mitch McCarron (9)
| RAC Arena11,950
| 0–1
|-style="background:#fcc;"
| 2
| 5 December
| Illawarra
| L 71–81
| Cameron Bairstow (15)
| Todd Withers (13)
| Bairstow, McCarron (4)
| Adelaide Entertainment Centre4,802
| 0–2
|-style="background:#cfc;"
| 3
| 9 December
| @ Tasmania
| W 80–83
| Dusty Hannahs (15)
| Humphries, McCarron (6)
| Dusty Hannahs (4)
| MyState Bank Arena4,738
| 1–2
|-style="background:#cfc;"
| 4
| 12 December
| New Zealand
| W 98–85
| Dusty Hannahs (25)
| Mitch McCarron (13)
| Mitch McCarron (5)
| Adelaide Entertainment Centre4,445
| 2–2
|-style="background:#fcc;"
| 5
| 18 December
| @ Cairns
| L 93–67
| Dusty Hannahs (20)
| Isaac Humphries (10)
| Mitch McCarron (4)
| Cairns Convention Centre3,314
| 2–3

|-style="background:#cfc;"
| 6
| 18 January
| Perth
| W 87–74
| Daniel Johnson (21)
| Mitch McCarron (12)
| Mitch McCarron (8)
| Adelaide Entertainment Centre4,758
| 3–3
|-style="background:#fcc;"
| 7
| 22 January
| Melbourne
| L 78–97
| Cameron Bairstow (18)
| Mitch McCarron (10)
| Mitch McCarron (7)
| Adelaide Entertainment Centre4,819
| 3–4
|-style="background:#fcc;"
| 8
| 24 January
| @ Illawarra
| L 100–89
| Sunday Dech (20)
| Cameron Bairstow (10)
| Mitch McCarron (5)
| WIN Entertainment Centre2,141
| 3–5
|-style="background:#fcc;"
| 9
| 28 January
| @ Tasmania
| L 76–71
| Dusty Hannahs (22)
| Cameron Bairstow (18)
| Daniel Johnson (5)
| MyState Bank Arena4,632
| 3–6
|-style="background:#cfc;"
| 10
| 30 January
| Melbourne
| W 88–83 (OT)
| Dusty Hannahs (19)
| Cameron Bairstow (13)
| Bairstow, McCarron (5)
| Adelaide Entertainment Centre4,906
| 4–6

|-style="background:#fcc;"
| 11
| 11 February
| @ Brisbane
| L 77–73
| Daniel Johnson (15)
| Daniel Johnson (14)
| Johnson, McCarron (4)
| Nissan Arena2,358
| 4–7
|-style="background:#cfc;"
| 12
| 20 February
| Cairns
| W 82–71
| Daniel Johnson (18)
| Daniel Johnson (9)
| Dech, McCarron (5)
| Adelaide Entertainment Centre5,068
| 5–7
|-style="background:#fcc;"
| 13
| 25 February
| @ Illawarra
| L 87–71
| Sunday Dech (18)
| Cameron Bairstow (12)
| Mitch McCarron (4)
| WIN Entertainment Centre3,001
| 5–8
|-style="background:#fcc;"
| 14
| 27 February
| Sydney
| L 90–93
| Dusty Hannahs (24)
| Bairstow, Johnson (8)
| Mitch McCarron (7)
| Adelaide Entertainment Centre4,813
| 5–9

|-style="background:#fcc;"
| 15
| 4 March 
| S.E. Melbourne
| L 76–83
| Daniel Johnson (31)
| Johnson, Sotto (8)
| Mitch McCarron (9)
| Adelaide Entertainment Centre4,775
| 5–10
|-style="background:#fcc;"
| 16
| 6 March 
| Perth
| L 73–92
| Daniel Johnson (19)
| Daniel Johnson (12)
| Mitch McCarron (6)
| Adelaide Entertainment Centre4,157
| 5–11
|-style="background:#fcc;"
| 17
| 12 March 
| @ New Zealand
| L 84–75
| Kai Sotto (14)
| Sunday Dech (8)
| Sunday Dech (7)
| Adelaide Arena3,044
| 5–12
|-style="background:#cfc;"
| 18
| 18 March 
| Cairns
| W 83–57
| Mitch McCarron (21)
| Mitch McCarron (10)
| Dech, McCarron (3)
| Adelaide Entertainment Centre3,596
| 6–12
|-style="background:#fcc;"
| 19
| 20 March 
| @ Melbourne
| L 101–74
| Daniel Johnson (18)
| Sunday Dech (6)
| Dufelmeier, McCarron (3)
| John Cain Arena5,814
| 6–13
|-style="background:#cfc;"
| 20
| 27 March 
| S.E. Melbourne
| W 100–92
| Daniel Johnson (22)
| Daniel Johnson (10)
| Tad Dufelmeier (4)
| Adelaide Entertainment Centre3,765
| 7–13

|-style="background:#fcc;"
| 21
| 1 April 
| Tasmania
| L 72–80
| Daniel Johnson (16)
| Mitch McCarron (6)
| Mitch McCarron (8)
| Adelaide Entertainment Centre3,407
| 7–14
|-style="background:#fcc;"
| 22
| 3 April 
| @ Brisbane
| L 92–91
| Daniel Johnson (28)
| Mitch McCarron (10)
| Mitch McCarron (7)
| Nissan Arena3,280
| 7–15
|-style="background:#fcc;"
| 23
| 9 April 
| Sydney
| L 77–84
| Daniel Johnson (20)
| Johnson, McCarron (7)
| Johnson, McCarron (4)
| Adelaide Entertainment Centre4,748
| 7–16
|-style="background:#fcc;"
| 24
| 11 April 
| Brisbane
| L 85–93
| Kai Sotto (21)
| Daniel Johnson (10)
| Johnson, McCarron (6)
| Adelaide Entertainment Centre3,829
| 7–17
|-style="background:#cfc;"
| 25
| 14 April 
| @ Perth
| W 70–82
| Dech, Hannahs, Johnson (23)
| Dech, McCarron (9)
| Mitch McCarron (6)
| RAC Arena10,272
| 8–17
|-style="background:#cfc;"
| 26
| 17 April 
| @ Sydney
| W 82–90
| Dusty Hannahs (22)
| Daniel Johnson (12)
| Dusty Hannahs (4)
| Qudos Bank Arena10,260
| 9–17
|-style="background:#fcc;"
| 27
| 22 April 
| @ S.E. Melbourne
| L 94–91
| Sunday Dech (20)
| Daniel Johnson (6)
| Dech, Dufelmeier (6)
| John Cain Arena4,673
| 9–18
|-style="background:#cfc;"
| 28
| 24 April 
| @ New Zealand
| W 60–93
| Sunday Dech (19)
| Dech, Sotto, Withers (7)
| Tad Dufelmeier (5)
| MyState Bank Arenaclosed event
| 10–18

Transactions

Re-signed

Additions

Subtractions

Awards

Pre-season 
 Loggins-Bruton Cup: Adelaide 36ers
 Most Valuable Player (Ray Borner Medal): Mitch McCarron

Club awards 
 Most Improved: Hyrum Harris
 Coaches Award: Cameron Bairstow
 Members Choice: Daniel Johnson
 Best Defensive Player: Sunday Dech
 Chairman's Award: Mitch McCarron
 Club MVP: Daniel Johnson

See also 
 2021–22 NBL season
 Adelaide 36ers

References

External links 

 Official Website

Adelaide 36ers
Adelaide 36ers seasons
Adelaide 36ers season